Ape Canyon is a gorge along the edge of the Plains of Abraham, on the southeast shoulder of Mount St. Helens in the state of Washington. The gorge narrows to as close as eight feet (2.5 m) at one point. The name alludes to a reported encounter with several "apemen" in 1924, an event later incorporated into Bigfoot folklore.

Ape Canyon was heavily impacted by the 1980 eruption of Mount St. Helens. Adjacent to the steep rocky canyon is the present Ape Canyon trail, popular with hikers and mountain bikers. On the south side of the mountain is another feature named Ape Cave.

Alleged Bigfoot attack
Ape Canyon was reportedly the site of a violent encounter in 1924 between a group of miners and a group of apemen. These allegations were reported in the July 16, 1924, issue of The Oregonian.

William Halliday, director of the Western Speleological Survey, claims in his 1983 pamphlet Ape Cave and the Mount Saint Helens Apes that the miners' assailants were actually local youths. Until the eruption of Mount St. Helens, counselors from the YMCA's Camp Meehan on nearby Spirit Lake brought hikers to the canyon's edge and related a tradition that the 1924 incident was actually the result of young campers throwing light pumice stones into the canyon, not realizing there were miners at the bottom. Looking up, the miners would have only seen dark moonlit figures throwing stones at their cabin. The narrow walls of the canyon would have served to distort the voices of the YMCA campers enough to frighten the men below.

Disappearance of skier Jim Carter
The headline to a story by Marge Davenport, Oregon Journal staff writer, in an August 1963 issue of the Longview Times, datelined Spirit Lake, Washington, is "Ape Canyon Holds Unsolved Mystery."
It contains the following text:

'Carter's complete disappearance is an unsolved mystery to this day,' declared Bob Lee, a well-known Portland mountaineer .... 'Dr. Otto Trott, Lee Stark, and I finally came to the conclusion that the apes got him,' said Lee seriously.... On the way down the mountain, he [Carter] left the other climbers at a landmark called Dog's Head, at the 8000-foot (2400 m) level. He told them he would ski around to the left and take a picture of the group as they skied down to timberline. That was the last anyone saw of Carter. The next morning searchers found a discarded film box at the point where he had taken a picture.
From here, Carter evidently took off down the mountain a wild, death-defying dash, 'taking chances that no skier of his caliber would take unless something was terribly wrong or he was being pursued .... He jumped over two or three large crevasses and evidently was going like the devil.' When Carter's tracks reached the precipitous sides of Ape Canyon, the searchers were amazed to see that Carter had been in such a hurry that he went right down the steep canyon walls. But they did not find him at the bottom .... 'We combed the canyon, one end to the other, for five days. Sometimes there were as many as 75 people in the search party ....' After two weeks the search was called off.

Another article by the same author and in the same paper is titled, "Legendary Mt. St. Helens Apemen Called Legitimate" and covers much the same ground.

A third article by the same author, "Monster Sightings Rekindle Interest in Mt. St. Helens Hairy Apes,"
states: "An employee at the ranger station later had a lot of fun with a foot form. From time to time he left its imprints on the [Spirit] lake shore. This caused a lot of excitement, and later, when someone discovered the tracks were all of the same right foot, he admitted the hoax. However, the ape legend has persisted and more fuel has been added to the fire from time to time as intermittent reports have come in about persons sighting strange figures on the mountain sides, or hearing weird noises in the wilderness. However, the sightings last weekend [described earlier in the story] were the first reported in several years."

References

Further reading

Bigfoot
Canyons and gorges of Washington (state)
Gifford Pinchot National Forest
Landforms of Skamania County, Washington